Séamus Kennedy (born 26 June 1993) is an Irish Gaelic footballer and hurler who plays as a right wing-back for the Tipperary senior teams.

Born in Clonmel, County Tipperary, Kennedy attended Thurles CBS in order to play at Harty Cup level and socialise with John Meaghar. He arrived on the inter-county scene at the age of sixteen when he first linked up with the Tipperary minor hurling in 2010 and 2011, minor football team in 2011, before later joining the under-21 hurling team from 2012 until 2014, and football team in 2013 (as captain) and 2014. He made his senior football debut during the 2015 championship against Waterford, scoring one point. Kennedy immediately became a regular member of the starting fifteen.

At club level Kennedy is a two-time championship medal with Clonmel Commercials. He also plays hurling with St Mary's.

Kennedy was added to the Tipperary senior hurling team panel during the 2016 season, and made his Championship debut on 22 May 2016 against Cork in the Munster Championship quarter-final. Kennedy stated at right half back in the 0-22 to 0-13 win.
On 4 September 2016, he started in the half-back line for Tipperary in his first All-Ireland Final as Tipperary defeated Kilkenny by 2-29 to 2-20, with Kennedy getting his first ever championship point in the first half.

He followed this in the 2019 final with two points leading one former well known Tipperary hurler to comment that “he only hurls above in Croke Park.”

Honours

Player

St Mary's Hurling Club, Clonmel
Tipperary Intermediate Hurling Championship (1): 2017

Clonmel Commercials
Tipperary Senior Football Championship (6): 2012, 2015, 2017, 2019, 2020, 2022
Munster Senior Club Football Championship (1): 2015

Tipperary
All-Ireland Minor Football Championship (1): 2011
Munster Minor Football Championship (1): 2011
Munster Senior Hurling Championship (1):2016
All-Ireland Senior Hurling Championship (2):2016, 2019

Mary Immaculate College
Fitzgibbon Cup (1) : 2016

References

1993 births
Living people
Clonmel Commercials Gaelic footballers
Dual players
St Mary's (Tipperary) hurlers
Tipperary inter-county Gaelic footballers
Tipperary inter-county hurlers